Eugene Luther Gore Vidal (born Eugene Louis Vidal, October 3, 1925 – July 31, 2012) was an American writer and public intellectual known for his epigrammatic wit. His novels and essays interrogated the social and cultural sexual norms he perceived as driving American life. Beyond literature, Vidal was heavily involved in politics. He unsuccessfully sought office twice as a Democratic Party candidate, first in 1960 to the U.S. House of Representatives (for New York), and later in 1982 to the U.S. Senate (for California).

A grandson of a U.S. Senator, Vidal was born into an upper-class political family. As a political commentator and essayist, Vidal's primary focus was the history and society of the United States, especially how a militaristic foreign policy reduced the country to a decadent empire. His political and cultural essays were published in The Nation, the New Statesman, the New York Review of Books, and Esquire magazines. As a public intellectual, Gore Vidal's topical debates on sex, politics, and religion with other intellectuals and writers occasionally turned into quarrels with the likes of William F. Buckley Jr. and Norman Mailer.

As a novelist, Vidal explored the nature of corruption in public and private life. His style of narration evoked the time and place of his stories, and delineated the psychology of his characters. His third novel, The City and the Pillar (1948), offended the literary, political, and moral sensibilities of conservative book reviewers, the plot being about a dispassionately presented male homosexual relationship. In the historical novel genre, Vidal recreated the imperial world of Julian the Apostate (r. AD 361–363) in Julian (1964). Julian was the Roman emperor who attempted to re-establish Roman polytheism to counter Christianity. In social satire, Myra Breckinridge (1968) explores the mutability of gender roles and sexual orientation as being social constructs established by social mores. In Burr (1973) and Lincoln (1984), each protagonist is presented as "A Man of the People" and as "A Man" in a narrative exploration of how the public and private facets of personality affect the national politics of the United States.

Early life
Vidal was born in the cadet hospital of the U.S. Military Academy at West Point, New York, the only child of Eugene Luther Vidal (1895–1969) and Nina S. Gore (1903–1978). Vidal was born there because his father, a U.S. Army officer, was then serving as the first aeronautics instructor at the military academy. The middle name, Louis, was a mistake on the part of his father, "who could not remember, for certain, whether his own name was Eugene Louis or Eugene Luther". In the memoir Palimpsest (1995), Vidal said, "My birth certificate says 'Eugene Louis Vidal': this was changed to Eugene Luther Vidal Jr.; then Gore was added at my christening [in 1939]; then, at fourteen, I got rid of the first two names."

Vidal was baptized in January 1939, when he was 13 years old, by the headmaster of St. Albans school, where Vidal attended preparatory school. The baptismal ceremony was effected so he "could be confirmed [into the Episcopal faith]" at the Washington Cathedral, in February 1939, as "Eugene Luther Gore Vidal". He later said that, although the surname "Gore" was added to his names at the time of the baptism, "I wasn't named for him [maternal grandfather Thomas Pryor Gore], although he had a great influence on my life." In 1941, Vidal dropped his two first names, because he "wanted a sharp, distinctive name, appropriate for an aspiring author, or a national political leader ... I wasn't going to write as 'Gene' since there was already one. I didn't want to use the 'Jr.

His father, Eugene Luther Vidal Sr., was director (1933–1937) of the Commerce Department's Bureau of Air Commerce during the Roosevelt Administration, and was also the great love of the aviator Amelia Earhart. At the U.S. Military Academy, the exceptionally athletic Vidal Sr. had been a quarterback, coach, and captain of the football team; and an all-American basketball player. Subsequently, he competed in the 1920 Summer Olympics and in the 1924 Summer Olympics (seventh in the decathlon, and coach of the U.S. pentathlon). In the 1920s and the 1930s, Vidal Sr. was a founder or executive of three airline companies:  the Ludington Line (later Eastern Airlines), Transcontinental Air Transport (later Trans World Airlines), Northeast Airlines.

Gore's great-grandfather Eugen Fidel Vidal was born in Feldkirch, Austria, of Romansh background, and had come to the U.S. with Gore's Swiss great-grandmother, Emma Hartmann.

Vidal's mother, Nina Gore, was a socialite who made her Broadway theater debut as an extra actress in Sign of the Leopard, in 1928. In 1922, Nina married Eugene Luther Vidal Sr. and thirteen years later, in 1935, divorced him. Nina Gore Vidal then was married two more times; to Hugh D. Auchincloss and to Robert Olds. She also had "a long off-and-on affair" with the actor Clark Gable. As Nina Gore Auchincloss, Vidal's mother was an alternate delegate to the 1940 Democratic National Convention.

The subsequent marriages of his mother and father yielded four half-siblings for Gore Vidal – Vance Vidal, Valerie Vidal, Thomas Gore Auchincloss, and Nina Gore Auchincloss – one step-brother, Hugh D. "Yusha" Auchincloss III from his mother's second marriage to Hugh D. Auchincloss, and four step-brothers including Robin Olds from his mother's third marriage to Robert Olds, a major general in the United States Army Air Forces (USAAF), who died in 1943, 10 months after marrying Nina. Through Auchincloss Vidal also was the step-brother once removed of Jacqueline Kennedy. The nephews of Gore Vidal include Burr Steers, a writer and film director, and Hugh Auchincloss Steers (1963–1995), a figurative painter.

Raised in Washington, D.C., Vidal attended the Sidwell Friends School and St. Albans School. Given the blindness of his maternal grandfather, Senator Thomas Pryor Gore, of Oklahoma, Vidal read aloud to him, and was his Senate page, and his seeing-eye guide. In 1939, during his summer holiday, Vidal went with some colleagues and professor from St. Albans School on his first European trip, to visit Italy and France. He visited for the first time Rome, the city which came to be "at the center of Gore's literary imagination", and Paris. When the Second World War began in early September, the group was forced to an early return home; on his way back, he and his colleagues stopped in Great Britain, and they met the U.S. Ambassador to Great Britain, Joe Kennedy (the father of John Fitzgerald Kennedy, later the President of the United States of America). In 1940 he attended the Los Alamos Ranch School and later transferred to Phillips Exeter Academy, in Exeter, New Hampshire, where he contributed to the Exonian, the school newspaper.

Rather than attend university, Vidal enlisted in the U.S. Army at age 17 and was assigned to work as an office clerk in the USAAF. Later, Vidal passed the examinations necessary to become a maritime warrant officer (junior grade) in the Transportation Corps, and subsequently served as first mate of the F.S. 35th, a US Army Freight and Supply (FS) ship berthed at Dutch Harbor in the Aleutian Islands. After three years in service, Vidal suffered hypothermia, developed rheumatoid arthritis and, consequently, was reassigned to duty as a mess officer.

Literary career
Vidal's literary works were influenced by numerous other writers, poets and playwrights, novelists and essayists. These include, from antiquity, Petronius (d. AD 66), Juvenal (AD 60–140), and Apuleius (fl. c. AD 155); and from the post-Renaissance, Michel de Montaigne (1533–1592), Thomas Love Peacock (1785–1866), and George Meredith (1828–1909). More recent literary influences included Marcel Proust (1871–1922), Henry James (1843–1916), and Evelyn Waugh (1903–1966). The cultural critic Harold Bloom has written that Vidal believed that his sexuality had denied him full recognition from the literary community in the United States. Bloom himself contends that such limited recognition resulted more from Vidal's "best fictions" being "distinguished historical novels", a subgenre "no longer available for canonization".

Fiction

Vidal's literary career began with the success of the military novel Williwaw, a men-at-war story derived from his Alaskan Harbor Detachment duty during the Second World War. His third novel, The City and the Pillar (1948), caused a moralistic furor over his dispassionate presentation of a young protagonist coming to terms with his homosexuality. The novel was dedicated to "J. T."; decades later, Vidal confirmed that the initials were those of his boyhood friend and St. Albans classmate, James Trimble III, killed in the Battle of Iwo Jima on March 1, 1945, and that Trimble was the only person he ever loved. Critics railed against Vidal's presentation of homosexuality in the novel as natural, as it was viewed generally at the time as unnatural and immoral. Vidal claimed that New York Times critic Orville Prescott was so offended by the book that he refused to review or to permit other critics to review any book by Vidal. Vidal said that upon publication of the book, an editor at E. P. Dutton told him "You will never be forgiven for this book. Twenty years from now, you will still be attacked for it." Today, Vidal is often seen as an early champion of sexual liberation.

Vidal took the pseudonym "Edgar Box" and wrote the mystery novels Death in the Fifth Position (1952), Death before Bedtime (1953) and Death Likes it Hot (1954) featuring Peter Cutler Sargeant II, a publicist-turned-private-eye. His satirical novel Messiah, detailing the rise of a new nontheistic religion that comes to largely replace the Abrahamic faiths, was also published in 1954. The Edgar Box genre novels sold well and earned the black-listed Vidal a secret living. That mystery-novel success led Vidal to write in other genres, where he produced the stage play The Best Man: A Play about Politics (1960) and the television play Visit to a Small Planet (1957). Two early teleplays were A Sense of Justice (1955) and Honor. He also wrote the pulp novel Thieves Fall Out under the pseudonym Cameron Kay but refused to have it reprinted under his real name during his life.

In the 1960s, Vidal published Julian (1964), about the Roman Emperor Julian the Apostate (r. A.D. 361–363), who sought to reinstate polytheistic paganism when Julian viewed that Christianity threatened the cultural integrity of the Roman Empire; Washington, D.C. (1967), about political life during the presidential era of Franklin D. Roosevelt (1933–1945); and Myra Breckinridge (1968), a satire of the American movie business, by way of a school of dramatic arts owned by a transsexual woman, the eponymous anti-heroine.

After publishing the plays Weekend (1968) and An Evening With Richard Nixon (1972) and the novel Two Sisters: A Novel in the Form of a Memoir (1970), Vidal concentrated upon the essay and developed two types of fiction. The first type is about American history, novels specifically about the nature of national politics. The New York Times, quoting critic Harold Bloom about those historical novels, said that "Vidal's imagination of American politics is so powerful as to compel awe." The historical novels formed the seven-book series Narratives of Empire: (i) Burr (1973), (ii) Lincoln (1984), (iii) 1876 (1976), (iv) Empire (1987), (v) Hollywood (1990), (vi) Washington, D.C. (1967), and (vii) The Golden Age (2000). Besides U.S. history, Vidal also explored and analyzed the history of the ancient world, specifically the Axial Age (800–200 B.C.), with the novel Creation (1981). The novel was published without four chapters that were part of the manuscript he submitted to the publisher; years later, Vidal restored the chapters to the text and re-published the novel Creation in 2002.

The second type of fiction is the topical satire, such as Myron (1974), the sequel to Myra Breckinridge; Kalki (1978), about the end of the world and the consequent ennui; Duluth (1983), an alternate universe story; Live from Golgotha (1992), about the adventures of Timothy, Bishop of Macedonia, in the early days of Christianity; and The Smithsonian Institution (1998), a time-travel story.

Non-fiction

In the United States, Vidal is often considered an essayist rather than a novelist. Even the occasionally hostile literary critic, such as Martin Amis, admitted that "Essays are what he is good at ... [Vidal] is learned, funny, and exceptionally clear-sighted. Even his blind spots are illuminating."

For six decades, Vidal applied himself to socio-political, sexual, historical and literary subjects. In the essay anthology Armageddon (1987) he explored the intricacies of power (political and cultural) in the contemporary United States. His criticism of the incumbent U.S. president, Ronald Reagan, as a "triumph of the embalmer's art" communicated that Reagan's provincial worldview, and that of his administration's, was out of date and inadequate to the geopolitical realities of the world in the late twentieth century. In 1993, Vidal won the National Book Award for Nonfiction for the anthology United States: Essays 1952–92 (1993).

In 2000, Vidal published the collection of essays The Last Empire, then such self-described "pamphlets" as Perpetual War for Perpetual Peace, Dreaming War: Blood for Oil and the Cheney-Bush Junta and Imperial America, critiques of American expansionism, the military–industrial complex, the national security state and the George W. Bush administration. Vidal also wrote a historical essay about the  Founding Fathers, Inventing a Nation. In 1995, he published a memoir, Palimpsest, and in 2006 its follow-up volume, Point to Point Navigation. Earlier that year, Vidal had published Clouds and Eclipses: The Collected Short Stories.

In 2009, Vidal won the Medal for Distinguished Contribution to American Letters from the National Book Foundation, which called him a "prominent social critic on politics, history, literature and culture".
In the same year, the Man of Letters Gore Vidal was named honorary president of the American Humanist Association.

Hollywood

In 1956, MGM hired Vidal as a screenwriter with a four-year employment contract. In 1958, the director William Wyler required a script doctor to rewrite the screenplay for Ben-Hur (1959), originally written by Karl Tunberg. As one of several script doctors assigned to the project, Vidal rewrote significant portions of the script to resolve ambiguities of character motivation, specifically to clarify the enmity between the Jewish protagonist, Judah Ben-Hur, and the Roman antagonist, Messala, who had been close boyhood friends. In exchange for rewriting the Ben-Hur screenplay, on location in Italy, Vidal negotiated the early termination (at the two-year mark) of his four-year contract with MGM.

36 years later, in the documentary film The Celluloid Closet (1995), Vidal explained that Messala's failed attempt at resuming their homosexual, boyhood relationship motivated the ostensibly political enmity between Ben-Hur (Charlton Heston) and Messala (Stephen Boyd). Vidal said that Boyd was aware of the homosexual subtext to the scene and that the director, the producer and the screenwriter agreed to keep Heston ignorant of the subtext, lest he refuse to play the scene. In turn, on learning of that explanation, Heston said that Vidal had contributed little to the script of Ben-Hur. Despite Vidal's resolution of the character's motivations, the Screen Writers Guild assigned formal screenwriter-credit to Karl Tunberg, in accordance with the WGA screenwriting credit system, which favored the "original author" of a screenplay, rather than the writer of the filmed screenplay.

Two plays, The Best Man: A Play about Politics (1960, made into a film in 1964) and Visit to a Small Planet (1955), were theater and movie successes. Vidal occasionally returned to the movie business, and wrote historically accurate teleplays and screenplays about subjects important to him. Billy the Kid (1989) is one, about William H. Bonney, a gunman in the New Mexico territory Lincoln County War (1878), and later an outlaw in the U.S. Western frontier. Another is 1979's Caligula (based upon the life of the Roman Emperor Caligula), from which Vidal had his screenwriter credit removed because the producer, Bob Guccione, the director, Tinto Brass, and the leading actor, Malcolm McDowell, rewrote the script to add extra sex and violence to increase its commercial appeal.

In the 1960s, Vidal migrated to Italy, where he befriended the film director Federico Fellini, for whom he appeared in a cameo role in the film Roma (1972). He also appeared in the American television series Mary Hartman, Mary Hartman and in the films Bob Roberts (1992), a serio-comedy about a reactionary populist politician who manipulates youth culture to win votes; With Honors (1994), an Ivy league comedy-drama; Gattaca (1997), a science-fiction drama about genetic engineering; and Igby Goes Down (2002), a coming-of-age serio-comedy directed by his nephew, Burr Steers.

Politics

Political campaigns

Vidal began to drift towards the political left after he received his first paycheck, and realized how much money the government took in tax. He reasoned that if the government was taking so much money, then it should at least provide first-rate healthcare and education.

As a public intellectual, Vidal was identified with the liberal politicians and the progressive social causes of the old Democratic Party.

In 1960, Vidal was the Democratic candidate for Congress for the 29th Congressional District of New York, a usually Republican district that including most of the Catskills and the western bank of the Hudson River, including Newburgh, but lost to the Republican candidate J. Ernest Wharton, by a margin of 57 percent to 43 percent. Campaigning under the slogan of You'll get more with Gore, Vidal received the most votes any Democratic candidate had received in the district in fifty years and outpolled John F. Kennedy (who lost the district with 38 percent of the vote). Among his supporters were Eleanor Roosevelt and Paul Newman and Joanne Woodward, friends who spoke on his behalf.

In 1982, he campaigned against Jerry Brown, the incumbent Governor of California, in the Democratic primary election for the U.S. Senate; Vidal forecast accurately that the opposing Republican candidate (Pete Wilson) would win the election. That foray into senatorial politics is the subject of the documentary film Gore Vidal: The Man Who Said No (1983), directed by Gary Conklin.

In a 2001 article, "The Meaning of Timothy McVeigh," Gore undertook to discover why domestic terrorist Timothy McVeigh perpetrated the Oklahoma City bombing in 1995. He concluded that McVeigh (a politically disillusioned U.S. Army veteran of the First Iraq War, 1990–91) had destroyed the Alfred P. Murrah Federal Building as an act of revenge for the FBI's Waco massacre (1993) at the Branch Davidian Compound in Texas, believing that the U.S. government had mistreated Americans in the same manner that he believed that the U.S. Army had mistreated the Iraqis. In concluding the Vanity Fair article, Vidal refers to McVeigh as an "unlikely sole mover," and theorizes that foreign/domestic conspiracies could have been involved.

Vidal was very much against any kind of military intervention in the world. In Dreaming War: Blood for Oil and the Cheney-Bush Junta (2002), Vidal drew parallels about how the United States enters wars and said that President Franklin D. Roosevelt provoked Imperial Japan to attack the U.S. in order to justify the American entry to the Second World War (1939–45). He contended that Roosevelt had advance knowledge of the dawn-raid attack on Pearl Harbor (December 7, 1941). In the documentary Why We Fight (2005), Vidal said that, during the final months of the war, the Japanese had tried to surrender: "They were trying to surrender all that summer, but Truman wouldn't listen, because Truman wanted to drop the bombs ... To show off. To frighten Stalin. To change the balance of power in the world. To declare war on communism. Perhaps we were starting a pre-emptive world war".

Criticism of George W. Bush

As a public intellectual, Vidal criticized what he viewed as political harm to the nation and the voiding of the citizen's rights through the passage of the USA Patriot Act (2001) during the George W. Bush administration (2001–2009). He described Bush as "the stupidest man in the United States" and said that Bush's foreign policy was explicitly expansionist. He contended that the Bush Administration and their oil-business sponsors, aimed to control the petroleum of Central Asia, after having gained hegemony over the petroleum of the Persian Gulf in 1991.

Vidal became a member of the board of advisors of The World Can't Wait, a political organization which sought to publicly repudiate the foreign-policy program of the Bush Administration (2001–2009) and advocated Bush's impeachment for war crimes, such as the Second Iraq War (2003–2011) and torturing prisoners of war (soldiers, guerrillas, civilians) in violation of international law.

In May 2007, while discussing 9/11 conspiracy theories that might explain the "who?" and the "why?" of the 2001 terrorist attacks in New York City and Washington, D.C., Vidal said

Political philosophy

In the American Conservative article "My Pen Pal Gore Vidal" (2012), Bill Kauffman reported that Vidal's favorite American politician, during his lifetime, was Huey Long (1893–1935), the populist Governor (1928–32) and Senator (1932–35) from Louisiana, who also had perceived the essential, one-party nature of U.S. politics and who was assassinated by a lone gunman called Carl Weiss.

Despite that, Vidal said, "I think of myself as a conservative", with a proprietary attitude towards the United States. "My family helped start [this country] ... and we've been in political life ... since the 1690s, and I have a very possessive sense about this country". Based upon that background of populism, from 1970 to 1972, Vidal was a chairman of the People's Party of the United States. In 1971, he endorsed the consumer-rights advocate Ralph Nader for U.S. president in the 1972 election. In 2007, he endorsed Democrat Dennis Kucinich in his candidacy for the U.S. presidency (in 2008), because Kucinich was "the most eloquent of the lot" of presidential candidates, from either the Republican or the Democratic parties and that Kucinich was "very much a favorite out there, in the amber fields of grain".

In a September 30, 2009 interview with The Times of London, Vidal said that there soon would be a dictatorship in the United States. The newspaper emphasized that Vidal, described as "the Grand Old Man of American belles-lettres", claimed that America is rotting away – and to not expect Barack Obama to save the country and the nation from imperial decay. In this interview, he also updated his views of his life, the United States, and other political subjects. Vidal had earlier described what he saw as the political and cultural rot in the United States in his essay "The State of the Union" (1975),

Feuds

The Capote–Vidal feud 
In 1975, Vidal sued Truman Capote for slander, over the accusation that he had once been thrown out of the White House for being drunk, putting his arm around First Lady Jacqueline Kennedy, and then insulting her mother. Said Capote of Vidal at the time: "I'm always sad about Gore—very sad that he has to breathe every day." Mutual friend George Plimpton observed: "There's no venom like Capote's when he's on the prowl—and Gore's too, I don't know what division the feud should be in." The suit was settled in Vidal's favor when Lee Radziwill refused to testify on Capote's behalf, telling columnist Liz Smith, "Oh, Liz, what do we care; they're just a couple of fags! They're disgusting."

The Buckley–Vidal feud 

In 1968, the ABC television network hired the liberal Vidal and the conservative William F. Buckley Jr. as political analysts of the presidential-nomination conventions of the Republican and Democratic parties. After days of bickering, their debates degraded to vitriolic ad hominem attacks. Discussing the 1968 Democratic National Convention protests, the public intellectuals argued about freedom of speech, namely, the legality of protesters to display a Viet Cong flag in America, Vidal told Buckley to "shut up a minute". Buckley had likened violent left-wing protesters to German National Socialists. Vidal stated: "As far as I'm concerned, the only sort of pro-crypto-Nazi I can think of is yourself." Buckley replied: "Now listen, you queer. Stop calling me a crypto-Nazi, or I'll sock you in the goddamn face, and you'll stay plastered." ABC's Howard K. Smith interjected, and the debate resumed without violence. Later, Buckley said he regretted having called Vidal a "queer", but still expressed some distaste for Vidal when he said that he was an "evangelist for bisexuality".

In 1969, in Esquire magazine, Buckley continued his cultural feud with Vidal in the essay "On Experiencing Gore Vidal" (August 1969), in which he portrayed Vidal as an apologist for homosexuality; Buckley said, "The man who, in his essays, proclaims the normalcy of his affliction [i.e., homosexuality], and in his art the desirability of it, is not to be confused with the man who bears his sorrow quietly. The addict is to be pitied and even respected, not the pusher." The essay is collected in The Governor Listeth: A Book of Inspired Political Revelations (1970), an anthology of Buckley's writings from the time.

Vidal riposted in Esquire with the September 1969 essay "A Distasteful Encounter with William F. Buckley, Jr." and said that Buckley was "anti-black", "anti-semitic" and a "warmonger". Buckley sued Vidal for libel.

The feud continued in Esquire, where Vidal implied that in 1944, Buckley and unnamed siblings had vandalized a Protestant church in Sharon, Connecticut (the Buckley family hometown) after the wife of a pastor had sold a house to a Jewish family. Buckley again sued Vidal and Esquire for libel and Vidal filed a counterclaim for libel against Buckley, citing Buckley's characterization of Myra Breckinridge (1968) as a pornographic novel. The court dismissed Vidal's counterclaim. Buckley accepted a money settlement of $115,000 to pay the fee of his attorney and an editorial apology from Esquire, in which the publisher and the editors said that they were "utterly convinced" of the untruthfulness of Vidal's assertions. In a letter to Newsweek magazine, the publisher of Esquire said that "the settlement of Buckley's suit against us" was not "a 'disavowal' of Vidal's article. On the contrary, it clearly states that we published that article because we believed that Vidal had a right to assert his opinions, even though we did not share them."

In Gore Vidal: A Biography (1999), Fred Kaplan said that "The court had 'not' sustained Buckley's case against Esquire ... [that] the court had 'not' ruled that Vidal's article was 'defamatory'. It had ruled that the case would have to go to trial in order to determine, as a matter of fact, whether or not it was defamatory. The cash value of the settlement with Esquire represented 'only' Buckley's legal expenses."

In 2003, Buckley resumed his complaint of having been libeled by Vidal, this time with the publication of the anthology Esquire's Big Book of Great Writing (2003), which included Vidal's essay "A Distasteful Encounter with William F. Buckley, Jr." Again, the offended Buckley filed lawsuit for libel and Esquire magazine again settled Buckley's claim with $55,000–65,000 for the fees of his attorney and $10,000 for personal damages suffered by Buckley.

In the obituary "RIP WFB – in Hell" (March 20, 2008), Vidal remembered Buckley, who had died on February 27, 2008. Later, in the interview "Literary Lion: Questions for Gore Vidal" (June 15, 2008), New York Times reporter Deborah Solomon asked Vidal: "How did you feel, when you heard that Buckley died this year?" Vidal responded:

The Mailer–Vidal feud 
On December 15, 1971, during the recording of The Dick Cavett Show, with Janet Flanner, Norman Mailer allegedly head-butted Vidal when they were backstage. When a reporter asked Vidal why Mailer had knocked heads with him, Vidal said, "Once again, words failed Norman Mailer." During the recording of the talk show, Vidal and Mailer insulted each other, over what Vidal had written about him, prompting Mailer to say, "I've had to smell your works from time to time." Apparently, Mailer's umbrage resulted from Vidal's reference to Mailer having stabbed his wife of the time.

Views

Polanski rape case

In The Atlantic magazine interview "A Conversation with Gore Vidal" (October 2009), by John Meroney, Vidal spoke about topical and cultural matters of U.S. society. Asked his opinion about the arrest of the film director Roman Polanski, in Switzerland, in September 2009, in response to an extradition request by U.S. authorities, for having fled the U.S. in 1978 to avoid jail for the statutory rape of a thirteen-year-old girl in Hollywood, Vidal said: "I really don't give a fuck. Look, am I going to sit and weep every time a young hooker feels as though she's been taken advantage of?"

Asked for elaboration, Vidal explained the cultural temper of the U.S. and of the Hollywood movie business in the 1970s:

Asked to explain the term "American values", Vidal replied: "Lying and cheating. There's nothing better."

In response to Vidal's opinion about the decades-old Polanski rape case, a spokeswoman for the organization Survivors Network of those Abused by Priests, Barbara Dorris, said, "People should express their outrage, by refusing to buy any of his books", called Vidal a "mean-spirited buffoon" and said that, although "a boycott wouldn't hurt Vidal financially", it would "cause anyone else, with such callous views, to keep his mouth shut, and [so] avoid rubbing salt into the already deep [psychological] wounds of (the victims)" of sexual abuse.

Scientology
In 1997, Vidal was one of thirty-four public intellectuals and celebrities who joined a publicity campaign waged by Scientologists against the German government, signing an open letter addressed to German Chancellor Helmut Kohl, published in the International Herald Tribune, alleging that Scientologists in Germany were treated "in the same way that the Nazi regime persecuted the Jews". Scientologists are free to operate in Germany; the Church of Scientology, however, is not recognized as a religious body but as a business with political goals and thus monitored by the German domestic intelligence service. Despite signing the letter, Vidal was critical of Scientology as a religion.

Sexuality
In 1967, Vidal appeared in the CBS documentary CBS Reports: The Homosexuals, in which he expressed his views on homosexuality in the arts. Commenting on his life's work and his life, he described his style as "Knowing who you are, what you want to say, and not giving a damn."

Vidal often rebutted the label of "gay". He maintained that it referred to sexual acts rather than sexuality. Gore did not express a public stance on the HIV-AIDS crisis. According to Vidal's close friend Jay Parini, "Gore didn't think of himself as a gay guy. It makes him self-hating. How could he despise gays as much as he did? In my company he always used the term 'fags'. He was uncomfortable with being gay. Then again, he was wildly courageous." Biographer Fred Kaplan concluded: "He was not interested in making a difference for gay people, or being an advocate for gay rights. There was no such thing as 'straight' or 'gay' for him, just the body and sex."

In the September 1969 edition of Esquire, Vidal wrote:

Personal life

In the multi-volume memoir The Diary of Anaïs Nin (1931–74), Anaïs Nin said she had a love affair with Vidal, who denied her claim in his memoir Palimpsest (1995). In the online article "Gore Vidal's Secret, Unpublished Love Letter to Anaïs Nin" (2013), author Kim Krizan said she found an unpublished love letter from Vidal to Nin, which contradicts his denial of a love affair with Nin. Krizan said she found the love letter while researching Mirages, the latest volume of Nin's uncensored diary, to which Krizan wrote the foreword. Vidal would cruise the streets and bars of New York City and other locales and wrote in his memoir that by age twenty-five, he had had more than a thousand sexual encounters. Vidal also said that he had an intermittent romance with the actress Diana Lynn, and alluded to possibly having fathered a daughter. He was briefly engaged to the actress Joanne Woodward before she married the actor Paul Newman; after marrying, they briefly shared a house with Vidal in Los Angeles.

Vidal enjoyed telling his sexual exploits to friends. Vidal claimed to have slept with Fred Astaire when he first moved to Hollywood and also with a young Dennis Hopper.

In 1950, Vidal met Howard Austen, who became his partner for the next 53 years, until Austen's death. He said that the secret to his long relationship with Austen was that they did not have sex with each other: "It's easy to sustain a relationship when sex plays no part, and impossible, I have observed, when it does." In Celebrity: The Advocate Interviews (1995), by Judy Wiedner, Vidal said that he refused to call himself "gay" because he was not an adjective, adding "to be categorized is, simply, to be enslaved. Watch out. I have never thought of myself as a victim ... I've said—a thousand times?—in print and on TV, that everyone is bisexual."

In the course of his life, Vidal lived at various times in Italy and in the United States. In 2003, as his health began to fail with age, he sold his Italian villa La Rondinaia (The Swallow's Nest) on the Amalfi Coast in the province of Salerno and he and Austen returned to live in their 1929 villa in Outpost Estates, Los Angeles.  Howard Austen died in November 2003 and in February 2005 his remains were re-buried at Rock Creek Cemetery, in Washington, D.C., in a joint grave plot that Vidal had purchased for himself and Austen.

Death
In 2010, Vidal began to suffer from Wernicke–Korsakoff syndrome, a neurological disorder caused by his years of alcohol abuse. On July 31, 2012, Vidal died of pneumonia at his home in the Hollywood Hills at the age of 86. A memorial service was held for him at the Gerald Schoenfeld Theatre in New York City on August 23, 2012. He was buried next to Howard Austen in Rock Creek Cemetery, in Washington, D.C. Vidal said he chose his grave site because it is between the graves of two people who were important in his life: Henry Adams, the historian and writer, whose work Vidal admired; and his boyhood friend Jimmie Trimble who was killed in World War II, a tragedy that haunted Vidal for the rest of his life.

Legacy
Postmortem opinions and assessments of Vidal as a writer varied. The New York Times described him as "an Augustan figure who believed himself to be the last of a breed, and he was probably right. Few American writers have been more versatile, or gotten more mileage from their talent." The Los Angeles Times said that he was a literary juggernaut whose novels and essays were considered "among the most elegant in the English language". The Washington Post described him as a "major writer of the modern era ... [an] astonishingly versatile man of letters".

The Guardian said that "Vidal's critics disparaged his tendency to formulate an aphorism, rather than to argue, finding in his work an underlying note of contempt for those who did not agree with him. His fans, on the other hand, delighted in his unflagging wit and elegant style." The Daily Telegraph described the writer as "an icy iconoclast" who "delighted in chronicling what he perceived as the disintegration of civilisation around him". The BBC News said that he was "one of the finest post-war American writers ... an indefatigable critic of the whole American system ... Gore Vidal saw himself as the last of the breed of literary figures who became celebrities in their own right. Never a stranger to chat shows; his wry and witty opinions were sought after as much as his writing." In "The Culture of the United States Laments the Death of Gore Vidal", the Spanish on-line magazine Ideal said that Vidal's death was a loss to the "culture of the United States" and described him as a "great American novelist and essayist". In The Writer Gore Vidal is Dead in Los Angeles, the online edition of the Italian newspaper Corriere della Sera described the novelist as "the enfant terrible of American culture" and that he was "one of the giants of American literature". In Gore Vidal: The Killjoy of America, the French newspaper Le Figaro said that the public intellectual Vidal was "the killjoy of America" but that he also was an "outstanding polemicist" who used words "like high-precision weapons".

On August 23, 2012, in the program a Memorial for Gore Vidal in Manhattan, the life and works of the writer Gore Vidal were celebrated at the Gerald Schoenfeld Theatre, with a revival of The Best Man: A Play About Politics (1960). The writer and comedian Dick Cavett was host of the Vidalian celebration, which featured personal reminiscences about and performances of excerpts from the works of Vidal by friends and colleagues, such as Elizabeth Ashley, Candice Bergen, Hillary Clinton, Alan Cumming, James Earl Jones, Elaine May, Michael Moore, Susan Sarandon, Cybill Shepherd, and Liz Smith.

In popular culture
In the 1960s, the weekly American sketch comedy television program Rowan & Martin's Laugh-In featured a running-joke sketch about Vidal; the telephone operator Ernestine (Lily Tomlin) would call him, saying: "Mr. Veedul, this is the Phone Company calling! (snort! snort!)." The sketch, titled "Mr. Veedle", also appeared in Tomlin's comedy record album This Is a Recording (1972).

Vidal provided his own voice for the animated-cartoon version of himself in The Simpsons episode "Moe'N'a Lisa". He also voiced his animated-cartoon version in Family Guy. He was interviewed in the Da Ali G Show; the Ali G character mistakes him for Vidal Sassoon, a famous hairdresser.

The Buckley–Vidal debates, their aftermath and cultural significance, were the focus of a 2015 documentary film called Best of Enemies, as well as a 2021 play by James Graham, inspired by the film.

In season eight, episode eight of The Office titled "Gettysburg", Oscar Martinez calls Dwight Schrute "Gore Vidal" when Dwight tries to explain his version of history naming the "Battle of Schrute Farms" as the northernmost battle in the Civil War. Dwight responds to Oscar that he doesn't "know who that is".

A Netflix biopic titled Gore was filmed in 2017.  It was directed and co-written by Michael Hoffman, and based on Jay Parini's book Empire of Self, A Life of Gore Vidal. The film, which starred Kevin Spacey in the title role, was cancelled and remains unreleased due to sexual misconduct allegations made against Spacey.

Selected list of works

 The City and the Pillar (1948)
 The Best Man (1960)
 Julian (1964)
 Myra Breckinridge (1968)
 Burr (1973)
 Lincoln (1984)

Filmography

See also
 List of Venice Film Festival jury presidents
 Politics in fiction

References

External links

 Gore Vidal Index, by Harry Kloman
 Gore Vidal Pages
 
 
 
 
 
 
 Documentary, Gore Vidal: The United States of Amnesia:
 Film web site
 At Internet Movie Database
 Interview with Director Nicholas Wrathall
 Gore Vidal – Obituary, New York Times
 Gore Vidal Biography and Interview with American Academy of Achievement

 
1925 births
2012 deaths
20th-century American dramatists and playwrights
20th-century American essayists
20th-century American journalists
20th-century American male writers
20th-century American novelists
20th-century American short story writers
20th-century atheists
21st-century American dramatists and playwrights
21st-century American essayists
21st-century American journalists
21st-century American male writers
21st-century American novelists
21st-century American short story writers
21st-century atheists
Activists from California
Activists from New York (state)
American anti-capitalists
American atheists
American autobiographers
American historical novelists
American humanists
American literary critics
American male dramatists and playwrights
American male essayists
American male film actors
American male journalists
American male novelists
American male screenwriters
American male short story writers
American male television actors
American male voice actors
American memoirists
American people of Austrian descent
American people of Romansh descent
American people of Swiss descent
American political journalists
American political writers
American satirists
American secularists
American tax resisters
American travel writers
Bisexual male actors
Bisexual dramatists and playwrights
Bisexual novelists
Bisexual memoirists
Bisexual screenwriters
Bisexual military personnel
Burials at Rock Creek Cemetery
California Democrats
Conversationalists
Critics of religions
Critics of Scientology
Edgar Award winners
Epigrammatists
Film theorists
Humor researchers
Deaths from pneumonia in California
Irony theorists
American LGBT dramatists and playwrights
American LGBT novelists
American LGBT screenwriters
American LGBT military personnel
American LGBT journalists
LGBT people from California
LGBT people from New York (state)
Literacy and society theorists
Literary theorists
Mass media theorists
Media critics
Military personnel from New York (state)
The Nation (U.S. magazine) people
National Book Award winners
New York (state) Democrats
Non-interventionism
Novelists from California
Novelists from New York (state)
People from Hollywood, Los Angeles
People from Ravello
People from West Point, New York
Phillips Exeter Academy alumni
Philosophers of culture
Philosophers of history
Philosophers of literature
Philosophers of sexuality
Philosophers of social science
Philosophers of war
Political philosophers
Postmodern writers
Pseudonymous writers
American psychological fiction writers
Rhetoric theorists
Rhetoricians
Screenwriters from California
Screenwriters from New York (state)
Screenwriters from Washington, D.C.
Secular humanists
Sidwell Friends School alumni
American social commentators
Social philosophers
St. Albans School (Washington, D.C.) alumni
Theorists on Western civilization
United States Army Air Forces non-commissioned officers
United States Army Air Forces personnel of World War II
Writers about activism and social change
Writers about communism
Writers about globalization
Writers about religion and science
Writers from Los Angeles
Writers of historical fiction set in antiquity
Writers of historical fiction set in the early modern period
Writers of historical fiction set in the modern age
Members of the American Academy of Arts and Letters
American bisexual writers